Michael Jamieson (born 5 August 1988) is a Scottish former competitive swimmer who represented Great Britain at the Olympics, FINA world championships and European championships, and Scotland in the Commonwealth Games.  Jamieson won the silver medal in the men's 200-metre breaststroke at the 2012 Summer Olympics.  He now is the Head Coach for the Swimming Club, Natare West London.

Personal life
His father, also named Michael, was a professional footballer who played for Albion Rovers, Alloa Athletic and Stenhousemuir in the 1980s. Jamieson also played football, but decided to focus on swimming when he was thirteen years old.

He currently resides and studies in Bath, England.

Swimming career
Competing for Great Britain at the 2012 Summer Olympics, he won a silver medal behind his arch-rival Dániel Gyurta in the 200-metre breaststroke.  He broke the British record three times in the process, twice in the qualifying heats and once in the final (2:07.43), and came to within 0.12 seconds of the previous world record set by Christian Sprenger in 2009 (2:07.31). Only a new world record by two-time world 200 m breaststroke champion Dániel Gyurta denied Jamieson the gold.

He previously competed in the men's 100-metre breaststroke, finishing in 3rd place in the second semifinal, but failed to reach the final.

At the 2014 Commonwealth Games, he won a silver medal in the 200 m breaststroke behind Ross Murdoch.

He retired from competitive swimming in 2016 and began working as a swimming coach.

Honours 
Jamieson was inducted into the Scottish Swimming Hall of Fame in 2018.

See also
 List of Olympic medalists in swimming (men)

References

1988 births
Living people
Sportspeople from Glasgow
Scottish male swimmers
Olympic swimmers of Great Britain
Swimmers at the 2012 Summer Olympics
Male breaststroke swimmers
Olympic silver medallists for Great Britain
Medalists at the FINA World Swimming Championships (25 m)
Medalists at the 2012 Summer Olympics
Alumni of the University of Bath
Commonwealth Games silver medallists for Scotland
Swimmers at the 2010 Commonwealth Games
Swimmers at the 2014 Commonwealth Games
Olympic silver medalists in swimming
Commonwealth Games medallists in swimming
Team Bath swimmers
Scottish Olympic medallists
Medallists at the 2010 Commonwealth Games
Medallists at the 2014 Commonwealth Games